The Committee for Human Rights in North Korea (HRNK), formerly known as the U.S. Committee for Human Rights in North Korea, is a Washington, D.C.-based non-governmental research organization that "seeks to raise awareness about conditions in North Korea and to publish research that focuses the world’s attention on human rights abuses in that country."

Founded in 2001 by a group of foreign policy and human rights specialists, HRNK has published twenty-three reports on issues relevant to North Korean human rights today.  The committee’s leadership has testified to Congress about North Korean human rights and China’s forced repatriation of North Korean refugees.  In April 2012, HRNK held its first major conference on North Korean human rights to launch its publication, The Hidden Gulag, Second Edition, on North Korean political prison camps.

History

Establishment
HRNK was founded in 2001 by a group of foreign policy and human rights specialists to fill a gap in non-governmental expertise on North Korea.  Well-established organizations such as Amnesty International and Human Rights Watch initially found it difficult to incorporate North Korea, about which information is frequently difficult to obtain, into their models of research and advocacy.  HRNK, in contrast, was an explicitly non-partisan research organization.

In 2003 HRNK released the first edition of The Hidden Gulag by David Hawk.  This was the first comprehensive study of North Korea’s prison camp system.

Past Involvement
From its inception, HRNK promoted itself as a non-partisan holder of expertise on North Korea in the United States.  Early members of the Board of Directors included individuals with varying political affiliations and policy prescriptions—including Chuck Downs, Nicholas Eberstadt (of the American Enterprise Institute, conservative think-tank), Carl Gershman (president of National Endowment for Democracy), Morton I. Abramowitz (former president of the Carnegie Endowment for International Peace think-tank), and Samantha Power (one of the Obama administration's proponents of the 2011 military intervention in Libya.). 
Co-chairs of the Board of Directors included US Representative Stephen J. Solarz (cosponsor of the 1991 Gulf War) and Ambassador James R. Lilley (CIA agent during 30 years in Asia, worked in Laos to undermine communist insurgency and he helped to insert a number of CIA agents into China. He was also a member of Ronald Reagan administration), for whom the North Korean Human Rights Act of 2001 is named.  Solarz, a former New York Democratic congressman, was known as the "Marco Polo of Congress" for his long record of international travel and involvement in foreign affairs.  Most notably, he was the first American politician to visit Kim Il-sung.  Lilley was personally close to former president George HW Bush and served as Ambassador to the Republic of Korea and the People’s Republic of China.  Both Solarz and Lilley garnered respect from both sides of the aisle and emphasized a spirit of bipartisan comity.

Testimony in the U.S. Congress

In September 2011, HRNK executive director Greg Scarlatoiu testified at a hearing of the House Foreign Affairs Subcommittee on Africa, Global Health, and Human Rights, entitled "Human Rights in North Korea: Challenges and Opportunities".  Scarlatoiu emphasized the flow of information into North Korea, recommending on behalf of HRNK that "the United States should continue to expand radio broadcasting into North Korea and encourage other efforts that provide information directly to the North Korean people in accordance with the North Korean Human Rights Act".

The Congressional-Executive Commission on China received testimony from HRNK chair Roberta Cohen and Scarlatoiu on March 5, 2012, at a hearing on "China’s Repatriation of North Korean Refugees". HRNK presented six recommendations to the commission and encouraged China to fulfill international obligations to protect North Korean refugees.

In June 2014, HRNK co-chair Andrew Natsios testified before the House Committee on Foreign Affairs, Subcommittee on Africa, Global Health, Global Human Rights and International Organizations, in what was entitled "Human Rights Abuses and Crimes Against Humanity in North Korea". In addition to outlining the ongoing crimes against humanity exposed by the COI, Natsios claimed, "While the US administration proposed and discussed imposing sanctions and other forms of pressure on the North Korean regime on the UN Security Council level, they were measures taken in response to North Korea’s aggressions and nuclear weapons program, unrelated to human rights issues."

Governance
HRNK's Board of Directors includes prominent individuals from the North Korea and human rights policy communities.

Research work on human rights issues

International Abductions

HRNK released its publication, Taken: North Korea's Criminal Abduction of Citizens of Other Countries, to a crowd of 150 people in Washington, D.C. on May 5, 2011. Taken is a study that documents North Korean abductions, which total over 180,000 abductees, and exposes the breadth and scope of North Korea's actions. This report informed the international and D.C. communities about these crimes and helped build evidence for North Korea to be held accountable for its actions.

Prisons

HRNK, The International Coalition to Stop Crimes Against Humanity in North Korea, and Maureen and Mike Mansfield Foundation hosted the presentation of "Trapped in North Korea’s Gulag:The Story of Oh Kil-nam and His Family" on November 6, 2011. The event featured Dr. Oh Kil-nam and was delivered at the Mike and Maureen Mansfield Foundation. HRNK executive director spoke at the panel presentation.

HRNK released its publication, Hidden Gulag Second Edition: Political Prison Camps, and held a conference at the Peterson Institute for International Economics. The report calls for the dismantlement of the vast North Korean political prisoner camp system in which 150,000 to 200,000 are incarcerated. The April 10, 2012 conference on North Korea’s gulag brought together former North Korean prisoners, human rights experts, representatives of governments, UN agencies, Korea specialists, the private sector, and NGOs to inform, collaborate, discuss, and make recommendations on North Korean human rights issues.

HRNK presented "Human Rights in North Korea: Prison Camps in 2012" at the U.S.-Korea Institute at SAIS on December 13, 2012. Gordon Flake, co-vice chair of the board of directors at HRNK and executive director of the Maureen and Mike Mansfield Foundation, and HRNK board member Carl Gershman and president of National Endowment for Democracy presented information on North Korea during the panel discussion.

HRNK published Hidden Gulag IV: Gender Repression and Prisoner Disappearances by veteran human rights investigator David Hawk on September 18, 2015. The report uses satellite imagery and defector interviews to reveal the addition of a women's section to a prison camp facility known as Kyo-hwa-so No. 12 and describe the plight of North Korean women repatriated from China. The report also addresses "double disappearances", or North Koreans who vanished first into political prisons and again as such detention facilities were dismantled or relocated.

Satellite Imagery 
Published by HRNK in 2003, The Hidden Gulag, First Edition includes satellite imagery of political prison camps provided by DigitalGlobe with camp locations and facilities identified by North Korean defectors. In The Hidden Gulag Second Edition: Political Prison Camps, HRNK was able to publish 41 higher resolution camp images in which defectors marked structures as small as guard towers and homes with the advent of Google Earth technology. HRNK and AllSource Analysis, Inc. have worked together to conduct detailed satellite imagery analysis of specific camps over time, and some of this work contributed to the United Nations’ Report of the commission of inquiry on human rights in the Democratic People’s Republic of Korea. Most recently, HRNK and AllSource Analysis discovered the closure of the Camp 15 “Revolutionizing Zone” and issued this report: Imagery Analysis of Camp 15 “Yodŏk” Closure of the “Revolutionizing Zone.”

Songbun

HRNK released the first comprehensive study of North Korea’s discriminatory social classification system, Marked for Life: Songbun, North Korea's Social Classification System, to a group of 200 people at the American Enterprise Institute on June 6, 2012. As a starting point, this report recommended that North Korea allow the Office of the United Nations High Commissioner for Human Rights and the United Nations Special Rapporteur in North Korea full, free, and unimpeded access, so that they can study the impact of the songbun system on the human rights of North Koreans. Governments, NGOs and international organizations are urged to call attention to this deliberate state policy of discrimination and work to eliminate this practice that so flagrantly violates basic principles of human rights. This report informed the international and DC communities about this political system and helped further understanding of and policy responses to the North Korean regime.

Mass Surveillance and Coercion

HRNK launched its report, Coercion, Control, Surveillance, and Punishment: An Examination of North Korea’s Police State, at the Korea Economic Institute (KEI) on July 19, 2012, to a group of 100 people. Authored by North Korean leadership specialist Ken E. Gause, the publication reveals the labyrinth of pervasive security agencies and informants that help the Kim regime maintain surveillance and control over its people. This report informed the international and DC communities about the North Korean state security system and helped further understanding of and policy responses to the North Korean regime.

Executions 
HRNK’s 2012 report Coercion, Control, Surveillance, and Punishment: An Examination of the North Korean Police State reveals that public executions are not uncommon in North Korea, nor is the death penalty limited to the “most serious crimes,” constituting a violation of the International Covenant on Civil and Political Rights. Used to instill fear in the North Korean people, these public executions are usually conducted by firing squad but hangings occur occasionally as well.

Published by HRNK in 2012, The Hidden Gulag Second Edition: Political Prison Camps describes public and secret executions in the kwan-li-so and kyo-hwa-so prisons. Former prisoners report being forced to throw rocks at and hit corpses following executions. Most executions were punishments for attempted escape, but “crimes” such as eating chestnuts off the ground without permission were also punished by death. One prisoner witnessed an estimated 50-60 executions per year, including group executions of up to 20 people.

In April 2015, HRNK and AllSource Analysis, Inc. discovered what appeared to be a satellite image of an execution by ZPU-4 anti-aircraft machine guns at the Kanggon Military Training Center outside of Pyongyang. The report on this frightening finding, “Unusual Activity at the Kanggon Military Training Area in North Korea: Evidence of Execution by Anti-aircraft Machine Guns?,” garnered significant media attention, including coverage by The Washington Post and The Wall Street Journal. The authors also note reports of the executions of two generals and an unknown number of artists by anti-aircraft machine gun in 2013 as part of Kim Jong-un’s “fearpolitik” and purge of disloyal officials.

Major conferences

"Hidden Gulag" Conference (2012) 
At the Peterson Institute for International Economics in Washington, D.C., HRNK hosted its first major conference on the "Hidden Gulag", addressing North Korea’s network of political prison camps, on April 10, 2012. HRNK launched its publication, the second edition of The Hidden Gulag by former Amnesty International Executive Director and human rights specialist David Hawk, at the conference

The conference attracted significant media attention, including an editorial in The Washington Post that touted the conference as "unprecedented". Robert King, the U.S. Special Envoy for North Korean Human Rights Issues, addressed the conference.  Glyn Davies, the U.S. Special Representative for North Korean Policy, was also in attendance.

"A Call for Action" Conference (2012)
HRNK organized a conference at the Simon Wiesenthal Center at the Museum of Tolerance on October 12, 2012, on "North Korea’s Political Prisoner Camp System and the Plight of North Korean Refugees: A Call for Action".

HRNK's Executive Director and members of the Board of Directors spoke at the conference and provided education on North Korea. Additionally, HRNK arranged for speakers Rabbi Abraham Cooper, The Honorable Howard Berman, The Honorable Brad Sherman, The Honorable Ed Royce, R.O.K. Consul General Shin Yeon-sung, David Hawk, Dr. Han Dong-ho, Blaine Harden, Shin Dong-hyuk, Hannah Song, Melanie Kirkpatrick, and Dr. Cho Jung-hyun to speak.

"Heart of Darkness" Conference (2013)
The Illinois Holocaust Museum and Education Center and HRNK hosted a conference calling for the dismantlement of North Korea’s political prison camps at the Illinois Holocaust Museum & Education Center in Skokie, IL on November 6, 2013. HRNK provided the speakers, coordinated for the event, invited the Korean American community in the Chicago area, and presented talks on North Korea's political prison camps system.

This conference was delivered to 300 people, including Korean Americans and Holocaust survivors. The event, which was translated simultaneously on-site in Korean and English, was led by and featured HRNK Executive Director Greg Scarlatoiu, Resident Fellow Professor Hyun In-ae, and Board Co-Chair Roberta Cohen. They discussed the promotion of effective action and ways the Chicago and greater Midwest community can become involved in the North Korea-related advocacy and awareness.

"Human Rights in North Korea: An Address by Michael Kirby" Conference (2014)
The Brookings Institution and HRNK hosted an event in which Michael Kirby, chair of the U.N. Commission of Inquiry on Human Rights in North Korea (COI), addressed the report's findings and recommendations. The year-long investigation, which included hearings and interviews with North Korean defectors, found that "in many instances, the violations found entailed crimes against humanity based on state policies."

Following Justice Kirby's address, Marcus Noland of the Peterson Institute for International Economics and an HRNK board member commented on the report. And Roberta Cohen, Co-chair of HRNK and Non-resident Senior Fellow, Brookings, was on a panel discussing the implications of the COI. The conference drew significant media attention, and it was aired on C-SPAN.

Hidden Gulag IV and Camp 15 Imagery Update Release (2015) 
On September 18, 2015, HRNK launched its publications The Hidden Gulag IV: Gender Repression and Prison Disappearances and North Korea: Imagery Analysis of Camp 15 "Yodok" - Closure of the "Revolutionizing Zone" at the Newseum in Washington D.C. The conference featured presentations by the reports' authors David Hawk and Joseph S. Bermudez Jr. followed by a discussion with Roberta Cohen and Gwang-il Jung, a survivor of Camp No. 15 "Yodok".

Publications

HRNK has released 49 publications on North Korean human rights, on independent research, the testimony of  North Korean escapees, and satellite imagery analysis.  The most recent publications have addressed the reports of changes in the prison camps, the North Korean security apparatus, North Korea’s "songbun" social classification system, and the Kim regime’s network of "hidden gulag" political prison camps.

Prison camps
 The Hidden Gulag, First Edition by David Hawk (2003)
 North Korea’s Hidden Gulag: Interpreting Reports of Changes in the Prison Camps by David Hawk (2013)
 The Hidden Gulag, Second Edition by David Hawk (2012)
 North Korea’s Camp No. 22- Updated by HRNK and Digital Globe, Inc. (2012, archived here)
 North Korea’s Camp No. 25 by HRNK and Digital Globe, Inc. (2013)
 North Korea’s Camp No. 25, Update by Joseph S. Bermudez Jr. (2014; archived here)
 North Korea - Imagery Analysis of Camp 15 by Joseph S. Bermudez Jr. et al. (2015; archived here by Joseph S. Bermudez Jr. et al. (2015; archived here)
 Unusual Activity at the Kanggon Military Training Area in North Korea: Evidence of Execution by Anti-aircraft Machine Guns? by Greg Scarlatoiu and Joseph S. Bermudez, Jr. (2015)  
 Imagery Analysis of Camp 15 "Yodok" Closure of the "Revolutionizing Zone" by Joseph S. Bermudez Jr. et al. (2015)
 The Hidden Gulag IV: Gender Repression and Prison Disappearances by David Hawk (2015)
 North Korea Imagery Analysis of Camp 14 by Joseph S. Bermudez Jr., Andy Dinville, and Mike Eley (2015)
 North Korea Imagery Analysis of Camp 16, by Joseph S. Bermudez Jr. et al. (2015)
North Korea: Ch’oma-bong Restricted Area by Joseph S. Bermudez Jr., Andy Dinville, and Mike Eley (2016)
 Gulag, Inc.: The Use of Forced Labor in North Korea's Export Industries Kim Kwang-jin (2016)
North Korea: Kyo-hwa-so No. 12, Jongo-ri by Joseph S. Bermudez Jr. and Mike Eley (2016)
North Korea: Flooding at Kyo-hwa-so No. 12, Jongo-ri by Greg Scarlatoiu and Joseph S. Bermudez Jr. (2016)
North Korea Camp No. 25 Update 2 by Joseph S. Bermudez Jr., Andy Dinville, and Mike Eley (2016)
The Parallel Gulag: North Korea's "An-Jeon-Bu" Prison Camps by David Hawk with Amanda Mortwedt Oh (2017)
North Korea’s Long-term Re-education through Labor Camp (Kyo-hwa-so) at Pokchŏng-ni by Joseph S. Bermudez Jr., Greg Scarlatoiu, Amanda Mortwedt Oh, and Rosa Park (2019)
North Korea’s Long-term Re-education through Labor Camp (Kyo-hwa-so) No. 4 at Kangdong by Joseph S. Bermudez Jr., Greg Scarlatoiu, Amanda Mortwedt Oh, and Rosa Park (2019)
North Korea’s Long-term Prison-Labor Facility Kyo-hwa-so No. 1, Kaech’ŏn by Joseph S. Bermudez Jr., Greg Scarlatoiu, Amanda Mortwedt Oh, and Rosa Park (2020)

North Korean state and society

 Hunger and Human Rights: The Politics of Famine in North Korea by Stephen Haggard and Marcus Noland (2005)
 After Kim Jong-il: Can We Hope for Better Human Rights Protection? by Kim Kwang-jin (2009)
 Lives for Sale: Personal Accounts of Women Fleeing North Korea to China by Lee Hae-young (2009)
 Taken! North Korea's Criminal Abduction of Citizens in Other Countries by Yoshi Yamamoto (2011)
 North Korea After Kim Jong-il: Can We Hope for Better Human Rights Protection? by Kim Kwang-jin (2011)
 Coercion, Control, Surveillance, and Punishment: An Examination of the North Korean Police State by Ken E. Gause (2012)
 Marked For Life: Songbun, North Korea's Social Classification System by Robert Collins (2012)
 Coercion, Control, Surveillance, and Punishment: An Examination of the North Korean Police State- Updated by Ken E. Gause (2013)
 Illicit: North Korea's Evolving Operations to Earn Hard Currency by Sheena Chestnut Greitens (2014)
 Arsenal of Terror - North Korea, State Sponsor of Terrorism by Joshua Stanton (2015; archived here)
North Korean House of Cards: Leadership Dynamics Under Kim Jong-un by Ken E. Gause (2015)
Pyongyang Republic: North Korea's Capital of Human Rights Denial by Robert Collins (2016)
From Cradle to Grave: The Path of North Korean Innocents by Robert Collins and Amanda Mortwedt Oh (2017)
Denied from the Start: Human Rights at the Local Level in North Korea by Robert Collins (2018)
North Korea's Organization and Guidance Department: The Control Tower of Human Rights Denial by Robert Collins (2019)
Lost Generation: The Health and Human Rights of North Korean Children, 1990–2018 by W. Courtland Robinson (2019)
Digital Trenches: North Korea’s Information Counter-Offensive by Martyn Williams (2019)

International community
 Failure to Protect: A Call for the UN Security Council to Act in North Korea by DLA Piper LLC (2006)
 The North Korean Refugee Crisis: Human Rights and International Response by Stephen Haggard and Marcus Noland (2006)
 Legal Strategies for Protecting Human Rights in North Korea by Skadden, Arps, Meagher & Flom LLP (2007)
 Failure to Protect: The Ongoing Challenge of North Korea by DLA Piper LLC (2008)

See also
 Human rights in North Korea

References

Organizations established in 2001
North Korean democracy movements
Political organizations based in the United States
Human rights in North Korea
Organizations specializing in North Korean issues